A number of motor vessels have been named Georgios, including:

, a former Empire ship, which was named Georgios from 1964 to 1978
, a Panamanian coaster in service 1958–62

Ship names